Bethany Zummo (born February 15, 1993, in Dublin, California) is an American sitting volleyball player. She is a member of the United States women's national sitting volleyball team. She won with the team the gold medal at the 2016 Summer Paralympics. She also won with the team the 2015 Parapan American Games and 2019 Parapan American Games.

Zummo studied at Dublin High School. She played for University of Central Oklahoma. In 2020, she sewed masks and donated them.

References

External links
 
 Bethany Zummo at USA Volleyball
 
 

1993 births
Living people
American sitting volleyball players
Paralympic volleyball players of the United States
Paralympic gold medalists for the United States
Paralympic medalists in volleyball
Volleyball players at the 2016 Summer Paralympics
Medalists at the 2016 Summer Paralympics
People from Dublin, California